Deborah Gottheil Nehmad (born 1952) is an American artist and attorney.

Life
Nehmad was born in Brooklyn.

Deborah Nehmad received a Bachelor of Arts from Smith College in 1974 and a Juris Doctor degree (J.D.) from Georgetown University Law Center in 1982. After graduating, she practiced law and worked in politics (including the Carter White House). In 1984, her legal work brought her to Hawaii. Due to a back injury, she phased out her legal practice and began taking art courses at the Honolulu Academy of Arts and the University of Hawaii at Manoa. She eventually matriculated at the latter, receiving an MFA in printmaking in 1998.

Nehmad produced primarily abstract prints employing various techniques, often including pyrography. Since the mid 2010s, she has been creating works that deal with the issue of gun violence in the United States.

Collections
The Davis Museum and Cultural Center (Wellesley College), the Fine Arts Museums of San Francisco, the Hammer Museum (Los Angeles), the Hawaii State Art Museum, the Honolulu Museum of Art, the Hood Museum of Art (Hanover, New Hampshire), the Museum of Modern Art, New York, the Smith College Museum of Art, and the Yale University Art Gallery are among the public collections holding work by Deborah Nehmad.

References
 Morse, Morse (ed.), Honolulu Printmakers, Honolulu Academy of Arts, Honolulu, Hawaii, 2003, p. 88
 Morse, Marcia and Allison Wong, 10 Years: The Contemporary Museum at First Hawaiian Center, The Contemporary Museum, Honolulu, 2006, p. 88

Footnotes

Artists from Honolulu
1952 births
American women printmakers
Printmakers from Hawaii
20th-century American painters
20th-century American women artists
American lawyers
Living people
20th-century American printmakers
21st-century American women artists